Zideh-ye Pain (also Romanized as Zīdeh-ye Pā’īn) is a village in Sardar-e Jangal Rural District, Sardar-e Jangal District, Fuman County, Gilan Province, Iran. At the 2006 census, its population was 1,068, in 277 families.

References 

Populated places in Fuman County